The Chartreuse Notre-Dame des Prés was a Carthusian monastery (Charterhouse) in northern France, at Neuville-sous-Montreuil, in the Diocese of Arras, now Pas-de-Calais.

The charter of foundation is dated from the chateau d'Hardelot on 15 July 1324; the church was consecrated in 1338.

Early history

The foundation, being close to Calais, was liable to disturbance in time of war. Thus it was often sacked by the English during the wars of the fourteenth and fifteenth centuries, and was for a time abandoned. The religious returned when peace was restored.

In 1542 the monastery was again wrecked by the Imperial troops and in the wars of religion fresh troubles attended the community. Finally the house was rebuilt by Dom Bernard Bruyant in the latter part of the seventeenth century and remained undisturbed until the French Revolution. In 1790 the monastery was suppressed and its property sold by auction the following year.

Nineteenth century

Eighty-two years later the Carthusians repurchased a portion of their old estate and the first stone of the new monastery was laid on 2 April 1872. The work was pushed forward by the Prior, Dom Eusèbe Bergier, and was finished in three years. The monastery contained twenty-four cells in its cloister.

Montreuil took a special position among Carthusian houses, owing to the establishment there of a printing press from which has been issued a number of works connected with the order. Dom le Couteulx's "Annales" (in eight vols.) and the edition of Denys the Carthusian may be quoted as examples. By the "Association Laws" the community of Montreuil were once more ejected. The monks lodged in the Charterhouse of Parkminster, England; the printing works was transferred to Tournai, in Belgium.

References

Attribution
 The entry cites:
TROMBY, Storia ... dell' ordine cartusiano (Naples, 1773);
LE COUTEULX, Annales ordinis Cartusiensis (Montreuil, 1901); 
LEFEBVRE, S. Bruno et l'ordre des Chartreux (Paris, 1883).

Carthusian monasteries in France
1324 establishments in Europe
1320s establishments in France